Rajković is a village in the municipality of Mionica, Serbia. According to the 2011 census, the village has a population of 302 inhabitants.

Population

References

Populated places in Kolubara District